The Battle of Listven (1024) was part of the succession struggle following the death of Vladimir the Great (Volodymyr) in 1015.  It was fought between Mstislav of Chernigov and Kievan forces supporting Yaroslav the Wise; Mstislav defeated Yaroslav. According to legend, the battle took place at night during a thunderstorm.

Following the Baptism of Rus, Vladimir sent his son, Yaroslav, to govern Novgorod the Great in the north of the Rus' lands.  Mstislav was sent to Tmutarakan, in the south (on the Sea of Azov). Upon Vladimir's death, his son Sviatopok "The Accursed" seized the throne and killed three of his brothers, Sviatoslav of Smolensk and the more famous Boris and Gleb, the first Russian saints.  Sviatopolk was defeated by Yaroslav, who then challenged Mstislav for supremacy over Kiev.  Mstislav marched on Kiev, but the Kievans rejected him.  When he withdrew to Chernigov, northeast of Kiev, Yaroslav marched on him with an army of Varangians under Yakun but was defeated at Listven by Mstislav and Severians.

The battle led to a stalemate, with neither brother really able to gain supremacy over the other and rule from Kiev as sole ruler.  Two years later, the brothers divide control of Kievan Rus' along the Dniepr River, with Yaroslav taking the western or Right Bank and Mstislav the eastern or Left Bank.  Yaroslav ruled from Novgorod, while Mstislav remained at Chernigov.  This division persisted and the two princes seemed to rule compatibly until Mstislav died in 1036, after which Yaroslav became sole ruler over Kievan Rus, ruling in Kiev itself until his own death in 1054.

References

Listven
Listven
1024 in Europe
11th century in Kievan Rus'